TEGDME may refer to the chemicals:
 Triethylene glycol dimethyl ether (triglyme).
 Tetraethylene glycol dimethyl ether (tetraglyme).